The Rogue Song is a 1930 American pre-Code romantic and musical film that tells the story of a Russian bandit who falls in love with a princess, but takes his revenge on her when her brother rapes and kills his sister. The Metro-Goldwyn-Mayer production was directed by Lionel Barrymore and released in two versions, with and without sound. Hal Roach wrote and directed the Laurel and Hardy sequences and was not credited. The film stars Metropolitan Opera singer Lawrence Tibbett—who was nominated for an Academy Award for Best Actor for his performance—and Catherine Dale Owen. Laurel and Hardy were third-billed; their sequences were filmed at the last minute and interspersed throughout the film in an attempt to boost its potential box-office appeal.

This film, MGM's first all-talking Technicolor film, is partially lost as there are no known complete prints of this film. Fragments do exist.

Plot
The story takes place in the Russian Empire in the year 1910. Yegor (Lawrence Tibbett), a dashing (as well as singing) bandit leader meets Princess Vera (Catherine Dale Owen) at a mountain inn. They fall in love, but the relationship is shattered when Yegor kills Vera's brother, Prince Serge, for raping his sister, Nadja, and driving her to suicide. Yegor kidnaps Vera, forcing her to live a life of lowly servitude among the bandits. Vera manages to outwit Yegor, who is captured by soldiers and flogged. Vera begs Yegor's forgiveness. Although still in love with each other, they realize they cannot be together.

Cast
Lawrence Tibbett as Yegor
Catherine Dale Owen as Princess Vera 
Nance O'Neil as Princess Alexandra
Judith Vosselli as Tatiana
Ullrich Haupt as Prince Serge
Elsa Alsen as Yegor's mother
Florence Lake as Nadja
Lionel Belmore as Ossman
Wallace MacDonald as Hassan
Kate Price as Petrovna
H.A. Morgan as Frolov
Burr McIntosh as Count Peter
James Bradbury Jr. as Azamat
Stan Laurel as Ali-Bek
Oliver Hardy as Murza-Bek

Songs

 "The Rogue Song" (sung by Lawrence Tibbett)
 "The Narrative" (sung by Lawrence Tibbett)
 "Love Comes Like a Bird on the Wing" (sung by Lawrence Tibbett)
 "The White Dove" (sung by Lawrence Tibbett)
 "Swan Ballet" (played by studio orchestra)
 "Once in the Georgian Hills" (sung by Lawrence Tibbett)
 "When I'm Looking at You" (sung by Lawrence Tibbett)

Laurel and Hardy

There were eight comic episodes throughout the film in which Laurel and Hardy appeared. One of these has survived on film. In this scene, there is a storm and a tent is blown away revealing Stan and Oliver. They try to sleep without any cover. A bear enters a cave. Stan and Oliver decide to seek shelter in the cave and, because it is so dark, they can't see the bear. Oliver thinks that Stan is wearing a fur coat. The bear begins to growl. Stan and Oliver flee.

Another segment, in which Laurel swallows a bee, has also survived on the trailer to the film, which has survived almost intact.

Production

The film is MGM's first all-talking, all-color (Technicolor) production. It was also the screen debut of Lawrence Tibbett, a world-renowned star of the Metropolitan Opera. The film is notable today as Laurel and Hardy's first and only appearance in a color feature film (all of their feature films before and after were shot in black-and-white; their only other professionally shot color film was the wartime short The Tree in a Test Tube), although they were only minor players in the film.

The film was adapted by John Colton and Frances Marion from the operetta Gipsy Love by Robert Bodanzky and A. M. Willner.

Production was supervised by Paul Bern, and the anticipated 30-day shooting schedule began on August 29, 1929. The studio executives' response to the daily "rushes" was that the film was not working well and needed help. MGM borrowed Laurel and Hardy from Hal Roach, and after negotiations between Roach and Thalberg, Roach agreed to write and direct their scenes. The final film has eight scenes with the comedy duo. Principal photography ended on October 11.

Release
The film premiered in Hollywood at Grauman's Chinese Theatre on January 17, 1930.

Although Laurel and Hardy were minor players in the film, opera star Lawrence Tibbett was virtually unknown in much of the United States. As a result, in many places the film was advertised as "Laurel & Hardy in The Rogue Song".

Preservation status
Although the film is considered to be lost, as there are no known complete prints, some fragments have been found. A two and a half minute fragment that had been cut out of the film by a local projectionist was found in a bookstore in Cambridge, Massachusetts in 1981, it featured a comic segment with Laurel and Hardy hiding in a cave in which a bear has taken shelter. Another 500 foot piece, about 10 minutes long, which showed a ballet sequence by Albertina Rasch was found in Maine in 1998 and was restored by UCLA. Another reel of assorted clips is in the Czech Film Archive; it was screened at a convention in 1995. Another short fragment shows Lawrence Tibbett singing to Catherine Dale Owen as they are caught in a storm.

The film's trailer, which includes Laurel and Hardy, is extant except for the first 60 seconds, which were lost due to decomposition; the remainder was transferred to safety stock by UCLA. In the trailer, Tibbett sings "White Dove" to Owen. A short segment featuring the comics Laurel & Hardy is also seen in which Laurel has apparently swallowed a bee.

In addition to those film fragments, the complete soundtrack of the film and the trailer survived because it was re-recorded on Vitaphone disks for theaters that did not have optical sound systems, such as the Movietone system, which MGM usually utilized.

The estate of Lawrence Tibbett held a color copy of the entire Rogue Song for many years after his death. Tibbett liked the film and showed it frequently to his friends. The late Allan Jones was a regular visitor and friend and reportedly gained possession of the print, which his son Jack Jones destroyed because of nitrate film decomposition. Tibbett had recorded some of the songs from the film in studio recordings released by RCA Victor.

YouTube currently (November 2020) contains a reconstruction of the entire film, utilizing the complete soundtrack, the half hour or so of existing footage, and stills from the film.

MGM held the negative of reel four until early 1974.

See also
List of United States comedy films
Laurel and Hardy films
List of rediscovered films
List of early color feature films
 List of incomplete or partially lost films

References

External links

 
 
 

1930 films
1930s color films
Metro-Goldwyn-Mayer films
Lost American films
American romantic musical films
American films about revenge
Films based on operettas
Films directed by Lionel Barrymore
Films produced by Irving Thalberg
Films set in the Russian Empire
Films set in 1910
Films about rape
Films with screenplays by Frances Marion
Operetta films
Films scored by Dimitri Tiomkin
1930 lost films
1930s romantic musical films
1930s English-language films
1930s American films